Dnister Zalishchyky was an amateur football club from the city of Zalishchyky, Ukraine.

Zalishchyky is located on the banks of the Dniester River, hence the club's name. From the 1992 to 1994–95 seasons the club competed at the professional level. In 1995 the club withdrew from professional competitions.

Honours
 Transitional League
 Winners (1): 1992 

 Ternopil Oblast Football Championship
Winners (4): 1974, 1985, 1990, 2004
Runners-up (2): 2013, 2015

League and cup history

{|class="wikitable"
|-bgcolor="#efefef"
! Season
! Div.
! Pos.
! Pl.
! W
! D
! L
! GS
! GA
! P
!Domestic Cup
!colspan=2|Europe
!Notes
|-
|align=center|1991
|align=center|4th
|align=center bgcolor=silver|2
|align=center|28
|align=center|17
|align=center|4
|align=center|7
|align=center|48
|align=center|24
|align=center|38
|align=center|
|align=center|
|align=center|
|align=center bgcolor=lightgreen|
|-
|align=center|1992
|align=center rowspan=3|3rd
|align=center bgcolor=gold|1
|align=center|16
|align=center|8
|align=center|5
|align=center|3
|align=center|15
|align=center|13
|align=center|21
|align=center|
|align=center|
|align=center|
|align=center|
|-
|align=center|1992–93
|align=center|15
|align=center|34
|align=center|11
|align=center|5
|align=center|18
|align=center|30
|align=center|45
|align=center|27
|align=center|Q1 round
|align=center|
|align=center|
|align=center|
|-
|align=center|1993–94
|align=center|21
|align=center|42
|align=center|10
|align=center|9
|align=center|23
|align=center|29
|align=center|62
|align=center|29
|align=center|Q1 round
|align=center|
|align=center|
|align=center bgcolor=pink| Relegated
|-
|align=center|1994–95
|align=center|3rd 
|align=center|22
|align=center|42
|align=center|5
|align=center|4
|align=center|33
|align=center|18
|align=center|40
|align=center|19
|align=center|Q1 round
|align=center|
|align=center|
|align=center bgcolor=pink| Relegated
|-
|}

External links
 Official website
 Dnister Zalishchyky at FootballFacts.ru

 
Amateur football clubs in Ukraine
Football clubs in Ternopil Oblast
Sport in Zalishchyky